The 1845 Vermont gubernatorial election was held on September 2, 1845.

Incumbent Whig Governor William Slade defeated Democratic nominee Daniel Kellogg and Liberty nominee William R. Shafter.

Since no candidate received a majority in the popular vote, Slade was elected by the Vermont General Assembly per the state constitution.

General election

Candidates
Daniel Kellogg, Democratic, former United States Attorney for the District of Vermont, Democratic nominee for Governor in 1843 and 1844
William R. Shafter, Liberty, farmer and judge, Liberty nominee for Governor in 1844
William Slade, Whig, incumbent Governor

Results

Legislative election
As no candidate received a majority of the vote, the Vermont General Assembly was required to decide the election, both Houses meeting jointly choosing among the top three vote-getters, Slade, Kellogg, and Shafter. The legislative election was held on October 9, 1845.

Notes

References

1845
Vermont
Gubernatorial